Pseudanaesthetis is a genus of longhorn beetles of the subfamily Lamiinae, containing the following species:

 Pseudanaesthetis atripes Pic, 1926
 Pseudanaesthetis densepunctata Breuning, 1954
 Pseudanaesthetis formosana Breuning, 1975
 Pseudanaesthetis langana Pic, 1922
 Pseudanaesthetis nigripennis Breuning, 1940
 Pseudanaesthetis rufa Gressitt, 1942
 Pseudanaesthetis rufipennis (Matsushita, 1933)
 Pseudanaesthetis sumatrana Pic, 1942

References

Desmiphorini